Samir Malcuit (born 2 October 1985) is a French footballer who plays for Poitiers, as a striker.

Career
Born in Montbéliard, Malcuit has played for Racing Paris, Marseille B, Raja Casablanca, MAS Fez, Dhofar and Poitiers.

Personal life
His brother Kévin is also a professional footballer. Malcuit is of Moroccan and Mauritanian descent.

References

1985 births
French footballers
French sportspeople of Moroccan descent
French sportspeople of Mauritanian descent
Racing Club de France Football players
Olympique de Marseille players
Raja CA players
Maghreb de Fès players
Dhofar Club players
Stade Poitevin FC players
Botola players
Association football forwards
French expatriate footballers
French expatriate sportspeople in Morocco
Expatriate footballers in Morocco
French expatriate sportspeople in Oman
Expatriate footballers in Oman
Living people
Sportspeople from Montbéliard
Footballers from Bourgogne-Franche-Comté